Gardelegi (in Spanish, Gardélegui) is a village in the municipality of Vitoria-Gasteiz in the province known as Alaba, in the Basque Autonomous Community in Spain. Located in the so-called Rural Area South of Vitoria, it is known for being located next to the municipal landfill at Vitoria, known as Gardelegi dump.

Towns in Álava